Adam Lasse Björn Hellgren (born 21 November 1990) is a Swedish professional golfer and Asian Tour player. He was runner-up in the 2021 Dormy Open on the Challenge Tour.

Early life and amateur career
Hellgren was born in 1990 in Västerås. He played ice hockey on one of Sweden's premier teams until he was 15 years old, when he focused on golf.

As a junior, Hellgren won the 2010 Order of Merit on the Skandia Tour, a Swedish under-21 circuit, after recording two victories, two runner-up finishes, and five other top-10s. He finished in second place after Jacob Glennemo at the Qualifying School for the 2011 Nordea Tour. He was runner-up behind Oscar Lengdén at the Swedish Junior Strokeplay Championship in 2011.

Hellgren accepted a golf scholarship to Florida State University and played golf with the Florida State Seminoles men's golf team 2011–2013.

Professional career
Hellgren left college after two years and turned professional in 2013, after the European Amateur Championship in August. He joined the Nordea Tour and won the first tournament he started in as a professional, the Landeryd Masters. In April 2014, he won the Black Mountain Invitational in Thailand and joined the Nordic Golf League (NGL).  

In 2015, he successfully defended his title at the Black Mountain Invitational and made his first cut on the European Tour at the 2015 Nordea Masters in Stockholm, Sweden. During the 2015 Swedish Matchplay Championship, he was hit by an errant tee-shot from Jesper Kennegård, was knocked to the ground, and required medical attention. He got up, dusted himself off, and won the match, won the tournament, and topped the 2015 Swedish Golf Tour Order of Merit.

In 2016, he won the Nordea Tour's Winter Series opener, the Lumine Lakes Open in Spain. At the European Tour's Nordea Masters in June, he finished tied 4th, along with Henrik Stenson, for the biggest paycheck of his career. As a result, he played the rest of the season on the Challenge Tour, where his best finish was a solo 6th place at the Vierumäki Finnish Challenge. On the 2017 Challenge Tour, his best finish was a T10 at the Volopa Irish Challenge. In 2018, he failed to make an impact, and was back on the NGL for the 2019 season.

Hellgren had a 59 in his hand at the 2020 PGA Championship Bråviken Open. He was bogey-free for 17 holes in the second round, with 8 birdies and two eagles, when his birdie putt on the 18th green stopped a few inches short of the hole and his score stayed at 60, 12 under par.

In 2020, Hellgren was back on the Challenge Tour, and recorded a T5 at the Northern Ireland Open. In 2021, he narrowly missed out on his first Challenge Tour title after two opening rounds of 65, as he lost a playoff at the Dormy Open to Félix Mory of France.

In January 2020, Hellgren joined the Asian Tour after finishing tied 9th at Q-School, but only competed in one event, the Bandar Malaysia Open, before play was halted due to the COVID-19 pandemic. He returned in November 2021 when the 2020–21–22 Asian Tour resumed. Hellgren played in 5 of the season's 8 tournaments, making each cut, and finished 57th on the Order of Merit.

Hellgren climbed to 41st in the Order of Merit on the 2022 Asian Tour, with a tie for 3rd at the Yeangder TPC in Taiwan his best result.

Amateur wins
 2008 Sura Open
 2009 Skandia Tour Elit #5
 2010 Skandia Tour Elit #5, Skandia Tour Elit #6

Source:

Professional wins (6)

Nordic Golf League wins (3)

Swedish Golf Tour wins (3)

Playoff record
Challenge Tour playoff record (0–1)

References

External links

Swedish male golfers
Florida State Seminoles men's golfers
Sportspeople from Västerås
1990 births
Living people
21st-century Swedish people